Encyclopedic museums are large, mostly national, institutions that offer visitors an abundance of information on a variety of subjects that tell both local and global stories. The aim of encyclopedic museums is to provide examples of each classification available for a field of knowledge. "When 3% of the world's population, or nearly 200 million people, living outside the country of their birth, encyclopedic museums play an especially important role in the building of civil society. They encourage curiosity about the world." James Cuno, President and Director of the Art Institute of Chicago, along with Neil MacGregor, are two of the most outspoken museum professionals who support encyclopedic museums. They state that encyclopedic museums are advantageous for society by exposing museum visitors to a wide variety of cultures, engendering a sense of a shared human history.  Some scholars and archaeologists, however, argue against encyclopedic museums because they remove cultural objects from their original cultural setting, losing their context.

References

Types of museums